Anatomy of a Disaster is a Philippine documentary television show broadcast by GMA Network. Hosted by Richard Gutierrez, it premiered on August 22, 2010. The show concluded on November 6, 2011.

Overview
Considered to be a more comprehensive version of Richard's former infotainment show Full Force Nature, Anatomy of a Disaster features different stories of tragedy, survival, and heroism based on the GRB Entertainment-produced documentary series Earth's Fury (also known as Anatomy of Disaster). Each of the 13 episodes provides an account of various natural disasters such as volcanic eruption, flood, hurricane, earthquake, and climate change, among others, in both local and international contexts.

Episodes
 Anatomy of a Disaster (August 22, 2010)
 Anatomy of a Disaster: Ragasa ng Panganib (September 26, 2010)
 Anatomy of a Disaster: Bagsik ng Magma (October 31, 2010)
 Anatomy of a Disaster: Urban Inferno (November 14, 2010)
 Anatomy of a Disaster: Himagsik Ng Kalikasan (January 23, 2011)
 Anatomy of a Disaster: Lagalag Ng Kalikasan (February 20, 2011)
 Anatomy of a Disaster: Week Long Special (March 21, 2011)
 Anatomy of a Disaster: Nag-aapoy Na Unos (April 24, 2011)
 Anatomy of a Disaster: Ang Puot ng Karagatan (May 22, 2011)

Ratings
According to AGB Nielsen Philippines' Mega Manila People/Individual television ratings, the pilot episode of Anatomy of a Disaster earned a 6.6% rating.

Accolades

References

External links
 

2010 Philippine television series debuts
2011 Philippine television series endings
Filipino-language television shows
GMA Network original programming
Philippine documentary television series
Philippine television series based on American television series
Disaster television series
Documentary films about natural disasters